Franck Perque (born 30 November 1974 in Amiens) is a former French racing cyclist.

Palmares

Road

1996
1st Paris–Tours Espoirs
1998
1st Stage 5 Tour de Normandie
2004
2nd Grand Prix de la Ville de Lillers
2006
1st Ronde de l'Oise
1st stages 1 & 3a (TTT)

Track
2000
 National points race champion
2006
 National points race champion

References

1974 births
Living people
French male cyclists
Cyclists at the 2004 Summer Olympics
Olympic cyclists of France
French track cyclists
Sportspeople from Amiens
Cyclists from Hauts-de-France